Henry Henderson may refer to:
Henry M. Henderson, mayor of Flint, Michigan 1857–1858
Henry Henderson (baseball) (1905–1980), American baseball player
Henry Henderson (missionary) (1843–1891), Scottish lay Christian founder of Blantyre Mission, Malawi
Henry Henderson Institute, Blantyre, Malawi, named after the missionary
Henry Henderson of Henderson's Relish
Henry Henderson (American football) from List of Utah State Aggies in the NFL Draft

See also
Harry Henderson (disambiguation)